The Infamous Decade was a period in Argentine history that began with the 1930 coup d'état against President Hipólito Yrigoyen. This decade was marked on one hand by significant rural exodus, with many small rural landowners ruined by the Great Depression, which in turn pushed the country towards import substitution industrialization, and on the other hand, by electoral fraud to perpetuate conservative governments in power. The poor results of economic policies and popular discontent led to another coup in 1943, the Revolution of 1943, by the Grupo de Oficiales Unidos (GOU), a nationalist faction of the Armed Forces, which triggered the rise to power of Juan Perón.

The Infamous Decade 

Besides electoral fraud, this period was characterised by persecution of the political opposition (mainly against the UCR) and generalised government corruption, against the background of the Great Depression. The impact of the economic crisis forced many farmers and other countryside workers to relocate to the outskirts of the larger cities, resulting in the creation of the first villas miseria (shanty towns). Thus, the population of Buenos Aires jumped from 1.5 million inhabitants in 1914 to 3.5 million in 1935. Lacking in political experience, in contrast with the European immigrants who brought with them socialist and anarchist ideas, these new city-dwellers would provide the social base, in the next decade, for Peronism.

Political and economic scandals 

The democratic liberal senator Lisandro de la Torre (founder in 1914 of the Democratic Progressive Party) denounced various scandals, directing an investigation on the meat trade starting in 1935. In the midst of the investigation, de la Torre's disciple, senator-elect Enzo Bordabehere, was murdered by Ramón Valdez Cora on the Senate floor, and the province of Santa Fe was intervened. The murder was depicted by Juan José Jusid's 1984 film, Asesinato en el Senado de la Nación.

CHADE (Companía Hispano Argentina de Electricidad, an offshoot of the Sofina multinational conglomerate) was also at the heart of an important political and financial scandal. The CHADE scandal, symbol of the Infamous Decade, led to investigations following the revolution of 1943 that deposed Ramón Castillo's government in a military coup, and to the subsequent Rodríguez Conde report on concessions given to the electrical companies.

Execution of Severino Di Giovanni and other anarchist show trials 
In 1931, a year after the execution of the Italian anarchist Severino Di Giovanni and his comrade Paulino Scarfó—who had implemented a propaganda of the deed campaign aimed both at international support of the Sacco and Vanzetti case and at attacking Fascist Italy's interests in Argentina—three anarchists were given life sentences during a show trial in which they were tortured, on the charges of having assassinated family members of conservative politician José M. Blanch. Known as the "prisoners of Bragado" (presos de Bragado), the case raised international public indignation. Anarchists, who had created a solidarity network with comrades expelled under the 1902 Law on Residency which legalised the expulsion of immigrants who "compromise national security or disturb public order", were considered as public enemies by Uriburu's dictatorship. Prior to their execution, three anarchist bombs had detonated at three strategic places on the Buenos Aires railway network on 20 January 1931, killing three and wounding 17.

In 1942 Minister Solano Lima signed the prisoners' releases; their names were cleared by a 1993 law upheld by Socialist deputy Guillermo Estévez Boero. In 2003 a law granted a pension to the daughter of one of the anarchist victims of this show trial.

Justo's presidency (1932–1938) 

In 1933 Arturo Jauretche took part in a failed uprising, led by Col. Francisco Bosch and Col. Gregorio Pomar in Paso de los Libres, in the province of Corrientes. He was subsequently detained.

Economic and social policy

The Roca-Runciman Treaty 

It was during Justo's term that Argentina signed the Roca-Runciman Treaty with the United Kingdom, which assured the UK a provision of fresh meat in exchange for important investments in the field of transportation in Argentina, given certain economic concessions from Argentina, such as giving control over the public transport in Buenos Aires to a British company, the Corporación de Transportes.

At the 1932 Ottawa Conference, the British had adopted measures that favored imports from its own colonies and dominions. The pressure from Argentine landowners for whom the government restored trade with the main buyer of Argentine grain and meat had been very strong. Led by the president of the British Trade Council, Viscount Walter Runciman, they were intense and resulted in the signing on April 27 of the Roca-Runciman Treaty.

The treaty created a scandal, because the UK allotted Argentina a quota less than any of its dominions—390,000 tons of meat per year were allotted to Argentina in exchange for many concessions to British companies, and 85% of exportation had to be arranged through British refrigerated shippers. In addition, the tariffs of the railways operated by the UK were not regulated, the treaty did not establish customs fees over coal,  had given special dispensation to British companies with investments in Argentina and had reduced the prices of their exports. So many problems resulted from the treaty that Vice President Roca, after the signing of the treaty, declared, "By its economic importance, Argentina resembles just a large British dominion."  Lisandro de la Torre, one of Roca's principal and most vociferous opponents, mocking his words in an editorial, wrote, "In these conditions we wouldn't be able to say that Argentina had been converted into a British dominion because England does not take the liberty to impose similar humiliations upon its dominions." 

The National Democratic Party, one of the parties that had supported the nomination of Justo for President, had split because of this controversy. Finally the Senate rescinded the treaty on July 28. Many workers strikes followed the deliberations, especially in Santa Fé Province, which ended with government intervention.

Import substitution industrialization and Pinedo's economic policies 
On the other hand, the trade isolationism of the world powers ultimately prompted the beginning of Argentine industrial development via import substitution. Important firms, such as the Bunge & Born agribusiness food company and the Tornquist group, previously turned towards exports but began to diversify their activities and invest in national industries aimed at local consumption.

Under the direction of  conservative Minister of Economy Federico Pinedo, economic policy became interventionist, although still in a conservative aim. Pinedo created the Central Bank (BCRA), which was advised by Sir Otto Niemeyer, the director of the Bank of England. The BCRA's board of director was mainly composed of personalities tied to private banks. It had as its missions the managing of the peso and the regulation of interest rates. Writer and thinker Raúl Scalabrini Ortiz was a strong critic of British involvement in Argentina, of which the BCRA itself was the prime example.

The Juntas Reguladores Nacionales were also created during this period, aimed at developing private and state activities and controlling the quality of products, both for national consumption and for export. In order to support prices of products and avoid overproduction, the Juntas destroyed entire loads of corn, used as fuel for locomotives, despite popular hunger. Thirty million pesos per year were spent to destroy wine products.

Furthermore, Pinedo launched a national project of road construction, the national network reaching 30,000 kilometers in 1938 (although many remained without pavement). This competed with the railway system, in the hands of mostly British companies, and furthered the penetration of US firms selling motor vehicles in the Argentine market. US foreign direct investment (FDI) grew during this time, with companies such as the textile firms Sudamtex, Ducilo and Anderson Clayton establishing themselves in Argentina, as well as the tire companies Firestone and Goodyear, the electronics firm Philco and the chemistry firm Johnson & Johnson.

Notable exceptions to these conservative policies were the policies of Luciano Molinas, governor of the Santa Fe Province (1932–1936) and one of the leader of the Democratic Progressive Party, and of Amadeo Sabattini, Governor of Córdoba (1936–1940). The first act of governor Molinas, assuming office on February 20, 1932, was to re-establish the progressive Constitution of the Santa Fe Province established by the Constituent Assembly of 1921, which had been abrogated by the radical governor Enrique Mosca. He also ensured independence of the judicial system, tax equality, secular education, women's suffrage and right of foreigners' to vote for the election of communal authorities. Molinas' administration also created the Provincial Department of Labour, which ensured the observance of article 28 of the provincial Constitution, concerning the 8 hours day, minimum wages and regulation of child and female labour. Molinas also reduced his salary from 2,500 to 1,800 pesos, suspended payment of the external debt of the province, which permitted Santa Fe's budget to become positive. Henceforth, he subsidized public works under the impulsion of the minister Alberto Casella, leading to increased local employment. He also implemented moderate land reforms, harshly opposed by the conservative and Alvearist radicals, as well as the Sociedad Rural. Finally, he created the Experimental Institute of Agricultural Investigation, a predecessor of the National Agricultural Technology Institute (INTA).

However, fearing electoral defeats for the Concordancia both in Santa Fe and in the Electoral College, Justo ordered military intervention in the Santa Fe Province on October 3, 1935, sending the Colonel Perlinger and the minister Joaquín F. Rodríguez to take control of the local government. Armed resistance against the federal intervention occurred, but in order to avoid a bloodbath, Molinas and De la Torre rejected the resistance. Rodríguez soon abrogated again the 1921 Constitution and progressively dismantled Molinas' achievements.

Justo had already ordered intervention in the Provinces of San Juan and Tucumán in 1934, and ordered similar military interventions in Catamarca, Santa Fe and Buenos Aires in 1935 (the latter enabling the fraudulent election of Manuel Fresco as governor ). Despite this federal intervention, Marcelo Alvear's Radical party (UCR) decided in 1935 to abandon its abstentionist policy protesting the fraud. Opposed to Alvear's turnaround, in 1935, young Yrigoyenistas from a nationalist background founded FORJA (Fuerza Orientadora Radical de la Juventud Argentina, Radical Orienting Force of Argentine Youth), which had as leaders the Socialist Arturo Jauretche, Raúl Scalabrini Ortiz and Gabriel del Mazo. FORJA's motto was: "We are a colonial Argentina, we want to be a free Argentina." Among other things, FORJA denounced the silence of the government on many problems such as the creation of the Central Bank, "economic sacrifices imposed in benefices of foreign capitalism", "petroleum politics", "arbitrary military interventions", "restrictions to freedom of opinion", "incorporation to the League of Nations", "suppression of relations with Russia", "parliamentary investigations", "the Senate crime", etc.

The workers' movement 
At the time of the 1930 coup, three trade unions existed in Argentina: the Confederación Obrera Argentina (COA, founded in 1926 and linked to the Socialist Party), the Unión Sindical Argentina (USA, anarcho-syndicalist) and the FORA V (dissolved by Uriburu). On September 20, 1930, the COA and the USA merged in the General Confederation of Labour (CGT), although the two rival tendencies remained.

Meanwhile, the syndicalist current of the CGT was discredited, because of its supporting alliance with the government in order to achieve social advances, while the socialist current proposed open opposition, tied to political support to the Socialist party. The syndicalist current was in particular affected by its agreements with the pro-fascist governor of Buenos Aires, Manuel Fresco (1936–1940). The latter, who had been elected during one of the "most burlesque" and "fraudulent" elections of the Infamous Decade (according to the words of the US ambassador,) commissioned the architect Francisco Salamone various buildings, which combined Art Deco, functionalism, Futurism and Fascist architectures.

Although the Great Depression and the subsequent rural exodus had brought many politically inexperienced workers to Buenos Aires, the spontaneous import substitution industrialization enabled, starting in 1935, coupled to the strengthening of trade unions, wages' increase. Henceforth, a 48-hour general strike was launched in January 1936 by workers' in construction, during which 3 workers and 3 policemen were killed.

Ortiz and Castillo administration (1938–1943) 
Roberto Marcelino Ortiz and Ramón S. Castillo's candidacies, respectively as president and vice-president, for the 1938 elections were launched at the British Chamber of Commerce, and supported by its president William Mc Callum. Ortiz, a former Alvearista, was fraudulently elected, and assumed his new office in February 1938. However, without much success, he attempted to clean up the country's corruption, ordering federal intervention in the Province of Buenos Aires, governed by Manuel Fresco, and cancelling the fraudulent elections which had been won by the conservative Alberto Barceló.

Federico Pinedo, still Minister of Economy, presented on 18 November 1940 an "Economic Reactivation Plan", which was to implement some protectionist measures and building of social lodging in order to face the crisis. He also proposed the nationalization of the British railways, having agreed upon advantageous terms for their owners with them beforehand. However, the conservatives voted against his plan, which led him to resign.

During World War II, Argentina maintained the same neutrality it had adopted during the first World War, which was advantageous for Great Britain. Although the USA attempted to push the country into the war, during the January 1942 Rio de Janeiro Conference, Argentina resisted, with support from the British. A few months later, in June 1942, Ortiz resigned because of his sickness, and died a month later.

He was replaced by his vice-president Castillo, who began to work to launch the candidacy of Robustiano Patrón Costas, vice-president of the Senate and sugar entrepreneur, who had supported him in 1938. Meanwhile, the Democratic Union political coalition (which included the Radical Civic Union, the Democratic Progressive Party, as well as the Socialist Party and the Communist Party) had been formed in 1942. Their electoral platform, aimed against endemic corruption, announced the needs to guarantee "freedom of thought and assembly" and "labor union rights", as well as vouching for "active solidarity with the people struggling against the Nazi-Fascist aggression".

June 1943 coup 

On 4 June 1943, the nationalist faction of the army, gathered around the Grupo de Oficiales Unidos (GOU, formed in March 1943) opposed both to corruption and to the Conservative government, overthrew Castillo in a coup. Composed under the initiative of the colonel Miguel A. Montes and Urbano de la Vega, the GOU included as main members the colonel Juan Domingo Perón and Enrique P. González. Sympathisers of Nazi Germany and Fascist Italy, the GOU established General Pedro Ramírez as chief of state, despite a short attempt by General Arturo Rawson to claim the office.

Presidents of the Infamous Decade 
José Félix Uriburu (1930–1932)
Agustín Pedro Justo (1932–1938)
Roberto Marcelino Ortiz (1938–1940)
Ramón S. Castillo (1940–1943)

References

Bibliography 
 Nállim, Jorge. "Between the Local and the Transnational: New Historiographical Approaches on Argentine Political History, 1930 to 1943." Estudios Interdisciplinarios de América Latina y el Caribe 25.1 (2014): 103-120. online
Felipe Pigna, Los Mitos de la Historia Argentina, 3, ed. Planeta, 2006 (reed.2007)
 Gisela Cramer, "Argentine Riddle. The Pinedo Plan of 1940 and the Political Economy of the Early War Years", Journal of Latin American Studies, 30 (octubre 1998), pp. 519–550
 Gisela Cramer, "Pre-peronist Argentina and the Origins of IAPI", en: Iberoamericana Vol. 2, No. 5 (2002), pp. 55–78.
 Juan José LLach, "El Plan Pinedo de 1940, su significado histórico y los orígenes de la economía política del peronismo", Desarrollo Económico (enero-marzo 1984)

External links
Década Infame at Todo-Argentina (Spanish)
Portal Planeta's article (Spanish)

 
Great Depression
20th century in Argentina
1930 in Argentina
Electoral fraud